An alley is a narrow lane, path, or passageway.

Alley may also refer to:

 In typography, alley refers to the gap between two columns of text
 A bowling alley is a building where the game of bowling is played
 An alley is a technical term in track and field to describe a technique in staging the start of a track race with multiple athletes sharing multiple lanes